Catephia corticea is a species of moth of the  family Erebidae. It is found in Kenya.

References

Catephia
Moths described in 1922
Moths of Africa